The 2017 Senior Open Championship was a senior major golf championship and the 31st Senior Open Championship, held 27–30 July at Royal Porthcawl Golf Club in Porthcawl, Wales. It was the 2nd Senior Open Championship played at the course and the 15th Senior Open Championship played as a senior major championship.

World Golf Hall of Fame member Bernhard Langer won by three strokes over Corey Pavin. The 2017 event was Langer's third Senior Open Championship title and his tenth senior major championship victory. Langer also won the 2014 Senior Open Championship at Royal Porthcawl Golf Club.

Venue

The 2017 event was the second Senior Open Championship played at Royal Porthcawl.

Course layout

Field
The field consisted of 144 competitors: 135 professionals and 9 amateurs. An 18-hole stroke play qualifying round was held on Monday, 24 July for players who were not already exempt.

Nationalities in the field

Past champions in the field

Made the cut

Round summaries

First round
Thursday, 27 July 2017

Bernhard Langer posted a two-under-par 69 on day one to lead by one shot.

Second round
Friday 28 July 2017

Scoring was difficult during the second round as only one player, Santiago Luna, broke par on Friday. Steve Flesch and Brad Faxon shot even-par rounds of 71, while the rest of the field shot over-par. Langer struggled to a 74 (+3) and fell back into a five-way tie for the lead going into the third round.

Amateurs: Lutz (+9), Haag (+13), Curtis (+20), Hastie (+21), Hoit (+22), White (+22), Tomlinson (+29), Creed (+31), Bell (+34)

Third round
Saturday, 29 July 2017

Langer rebounded with a bogey-free, six-under-par 65 on Saturday to take a four stroke lead into the final round. 2010 Senior Open runner-up Corey Pavin also shot a third round 65 to move into 2nd place. Peter Lonard shot a 67 (−4) to move into 3rd place and 5 shots of Langer's lead.

Amateurs: Lutz (+9),  Haag (+18)

Final round
Sunday, 30 July 2017

Bernhard Langer's lead was extended to five shots after Pavin bogeyed the first hole, however, the lead was cut to three after a birdie by Pavin and a bogey by Langer on the par-4 3rd hole. Pavin cut Langer's lead to two after a birdie on the par-3 5th. After a bogey by Pavin on the par-5 13th hole, Langer's lead was extended to three strokes, which he carried into the 72nd hole. Langer and Pavin both birdied the 72nd hole, as Langer secured the title and his tenth senior major championship.

Source:

Amateurs: Lutz (+17),  Haag (+21)

Scorecard

Cumulative tournament scores, relative to par

Source:

Notes and references

External links
Results on European Tour website
Results on PGA Tour website

Senior major golf championships
Golf tournaments in Wales
Senior Open Championship
Senior Open Championship
Senior Open Championship